Ysgol yr Hendre is a Welsh/Spanish-medium primary school in the large town of Trelew in Chubut Province, Argentina. It was opened on 6 March 2006, initially to teach children between three and five years of age in Welsh and Spanish. The Chubut education authorities authorised the establishment of the school and supports its aims.
 The school is twinned with Ysgol Pentreuchaf near Pwllheli in Wales.

Its name literally means ‘School of the Old Homestead/Dwelling’, where 
 (‘old residence’) is another way to say .

The development of the school was financed in part by a fundraising campaign in Wales led by the politician Dafydd Wigley and the artist Sir Kyffin Williams, which raised over US$60,000 in less than two years.

The school was part of a 21st-century revival in Welsh in "the Welsh colony" Y Wladfa on the Chubut River ( in Welsh). It is one of several active Welsh schools and nurseries. In 2005 there were 62 Welsh classes in Chubut, and Welsh was on the curriculum of two primary schools and two colleges in the Gaiman catchment area. In 2018 there were three bilingual Welsh-Spanish schools in Chubut Province.

References

External links 

 
 Project-Hiraeth – Documents the stories of the Welsh colony in Patagonia, Argentina through film, text and illustration.

Education in Chubut Province
Welsh settlement in Patagonia
Welsh-language schools
2006 establishments in Argentina
Educational institutions established in 2006